Zing is a Local Government Area in Taraba State, Nigeria. Its headquarters are in the town of Zing.

It has an area of 1,030 km2 and a population of 127,363 as at the 2006 census. Zing is predominantly Mumuye. There are 12 Mumuye clans.

The name 'Zing' was given (renamed) after Lion which was "Zingang" before for clear and easy pronunciation, still many are but it can still be referred to  'Zina' which is a blessing to Mumuye Kingdom and its ancient culture. The Place Zing was an area where Lions base before the Mumuye came and conquered the Lion and occupied the Land, That is why you can see the status of Lion in the Kpanti's Palace. Koyunvoba 2007, Background of Lion In Zing Local Government.

The postal code of the area is 661.

References

{ { Koyunvoba P. 2007 Lion Base in Zing

Local Government Areas in Taraba State